This list of oldest heraldry aims to include the oldest documented, non-attributed heraldic achievements for individuals, families, locations or institutions.

Heraldry developed in the High Middle Ages (c. 1000-1250), based on earlier, "pre-heraldic" or "ante-heraldic", traditions of visual identification by means of seals, field signs, emblems used on coins, etc. Notably, lions that would subsequently appear in 12th-century coats of arms of European nobility have pre-figurations in the animal style of ancient art (specifically the style of Scythian art as it developed from c. the 7th century BC).

The origin of the term heraldry itself (Middle English heraldy, Old French hiraudie), can be placed in the context of the early forms of the knightly tournaments in the 12th century. Combatants wore full armour, and identified themselves by wearing their emblems on their shields. A herald (Old French heraut, from a Frankish *hariwald "commander of an army") was an officer who would announce the competitors. 
The display of heraldic emblems on shields is an innovation of the 12th century. The kite shields shown in the Bayeux Tapestry (c. 1070) sometimes show simple cross or spiral ornaments, but no heraldic emblems. Similarly, Frankish or German round shields of the 11th century (Ottonian, Salian) are sometimes depicted with simple geometric ornamentation, but not with figurative emblems.
Early mention of heraldic shields in Middle High German literature likewise dates to the 12th century.

In some cases, the adoption of a symbol on a coat of arms was the culmination of a gradual progression, whereby a family can be seen using a symbol in a quasi-heraldic manner prior to its adoption as part of a formal coat.  An example of this are the Counts of Saint-Pol, who between 1083 and 1130 decorated their coins with wheat sheafs that are then found on the equestrian seal of Count Engueraud (1141–50) placed in the blank space surrounding the mounted knight, before appearing on the shield of count Anselm and his successors from 1162.  Similarly, the fleur-de-lis progressed from use as a decorative emblem by Henry I of France (1031–60) to then be displayed as a quasi-heraldic symbol by Louis VI, Louis VII, and Philip II (1180-1223) before becoming the charge of the French royal arms under the last of these kings.  Lions were used as heraldic emblems by Henry "the Lion" (before 1146), and Alfonso VII of León (d. 1157), and probably by Henry I of England (d. 1135), in the first half of the 12th century, and lions later appear on the coats of arms of their respective realms.

The oldest surviving heraldic seals are the equestrian seals (German: Reitersiegel) used by high nobility in the second half of the 12th century. Among the oldest examples from the Holy Roman Empire, of what would develop into German heraldry, is the lion (or "leopard") of the Staufer coat of arms, first used before 1146 by Henry "the Lion", and in 1181 on the seal of Frederick VI of Swabia. Similar seals are known from England, one of the oldest being the equestrian seal of King Richard Lionheart of the House of Plantagenet, dated 1189, showing a heraldic lion design on the king's shield. His second seal, dated 1198, shows the three lions design which would subsequently become the royal coat of arms of England.

The earliest known colored heraldic representation appears on the funerary enamel of Geoffrey of Anjou (d. 1151), showing a coat of arms that appears to be the same as one later used by some of his descendants.  Depiction of heraldic shields in manuscript miniatures becomes more common in the early-to-mid 13th century, and dedicated armorials become fashionable in the mid-to-late 13th century.

List of oldest heraldry

See also

History of heraldry
 Ancient and modern arms
Roll of arms

External links
 https://www.theheraldrysociety.com/articles/as-it-was-in-the-beginning/

References

Gerard J. Brault. Early Blazon. Heraldic terminology in the twelfth and thirteenth centuries, with special reference to Arthurian literature. Oxford, Oxford University Press, 1972.

Armorials
Heraldry
High Middle Ages
Lists of symbols
Medieval culture
Heraldry